Muzaffarids or Muzaffarid dynasty may refer to:
 Muzaffarids (Iran), rulers of parts of central and southwestern Iran from 1335 to 1393
 Muzaffarids (Gujarat), rulers of the Sultanate of Gujarat in India from 1391 to 1583
 Muzaffarids (Somalia), rulers of Mogadishu from c. 1500 to c. 1624